Andreas Gottschalk (28 February 1815 in Düsseldorf – 8 September 1849) was a German physician. He was a member of the Cologne community Communist League. He was an exponent of the "Left" sectarian tendencies of the German working class movement.

He founded and became president in April 1848 of the Cologne Workers Association, which he led until he got arrested in June of that year. He was released from jail in December. After spending a short time abroad, he returned to Cologne, where he worked as a doctor for the poor until his death in the fall of 1849 having the previous year been "cheered on by a crowd of 5,000, called for the establishment of a revolutionary committee"as part of the 1848 revolts. after contracting cholera himself.

References

1815 births
1849 deaths
People from Düsseldorf
German socialists
German revolutionaries
Physicians from North Rhine-Westphalia